Doctor in Love is a 1957 comedy novel by the British writer Richard Gordon. It is part of the long-running Doctor series of novels.

Adaptation
It was turned into the 1960 film of the same title directed by Ralph Thomas and starring James Robertson Justice, Michael Craig and Leslie Phillips.

References

Bibliography
 Goble, Alan. The Complete Index to Literary Sources in Film. Walter de Gruyter, 1999.
 Pringle, David. Imaginary People: A Who's who of Fictional Characters from the Eighteenth Century to the Present Day. Scolar Press, 1996.

1957 British novels
Novels by Richard Gordon
Comedy novels
British novels adapted into films
Michael Joseph books
Novels set in hospitals